Duo Live is a live album by Richard Marx (a fifth for Marx, 22nd overall) and, Vertical Horizon band member, Matt Scannell (second for Scannell, eighth overall). Marx and Scannell exhibit both of their acclaimed works and share lead vocals on three songs, including a never before released song.

Track listing
"Endless Summer Nights" (Marx) - 5:10
"Good Evening" - 0:17
"You're A God" (Scannell) - 4:16
"We're Recording...." - 3:11
"Now And Forever" (Marx) - 4:24
"Freebird Intervention" - 2:17
"Give You Back" (Scannell) - 4:52
"Hazard" (Marx) - 4:26
"I'm Still Here" (Scannell) - 4:00
"Don't Mean Nothing" (Marx/Gaitsch) - 4:52
"We'll Talk About That Later" - 2:19
"We Are" (Scannell) - 4:16
"Should've Known Better" (Marx) - 4:26
"Everything You Want" (Scannell) - 4:48
"I'm Not Running" (Marx/Scannell) - 4:37
"Best I Ever Had" (Scannell) - 4:50
"Right Here Waiting" (Marx) - 5:40

Album credits

Personnel 
 Richard Marx – lead and backing vocals, acoustic guitar, acoustic piano, arrangements
 Matt Scannell – lead and backing vocals, acoustic guitar, arrangements

Production 
 Richard Marx – producer 
 Matt Scannell – producer 
 Matt Prock – recording, engineer, mixing 
 Steve Hardy – mastering

References

2010 live albums
Albums produced by Richard Marx
Richard Marx albums
Collaborative albums
Self-released albums